Velle is a 2021 Indian Hindi-language crime comedy film directed by Deven Munjal, written in an adaptation by Pankaj Kumar on the basis of a story by first assistant director Harish Dinkar, and produced by Aarushi Malhotra, Nandini Sharma and Rajnish Khanuja under Intercut Entertainment, with Ajay Devgn FFilms as presenter. A remake of the 2019 Telugu film Brochevarevarura, the film stars Abhay Deol, Mouni Roy, Karan Deol, debutantes Savant Singh Premi and Visshesh Tiwari, Anya Singh, Mahesh Thakur, Zakir Hussain, and Rajesh Kumar in pivotal roles, and follows a plot involving a script narration on one end and four immature kids trying to correct a plan gone wrong on the other. The film was released on 10 December 2021.

Plot
Riya, a school principal's daughter and her gang of high school friends, Rahul, Rambo, and Raju,lead carefree lives full of mischief. However, when she's warned away from the others by her father, the group decides to teach him a lesson. Elsewhere, Rishi, a writer, plans to narrate a film to budding actress Rohini, who develops an attraction towards him.

Cast
Abhay Deol as Rishi Singh
Mouni Roy as Rohini Roy
Karan Deol as Rahul Agarwal
Savant Singh Premi as Ramesh "Rambo" Bhatia
Vishesh Tiwari as Rajeshwar "Raju" Prasad
Anya Singh as Riya Sharma
Mahesh Thakur as Ravikant Agarwal, Rahul's father
Zakir Hussain as Radhe Shyam "RS" Sharma, Riya's father
 Anurag Arora as Randhir 
Rajesh Kumar as Police Inspector Rajni Verma 
Ajay Devgan as himself (cameo appearance)

Production
Filming started from 10 July 2021 in Gautam Budh Nagar UP. A majority of filming took place in Greater Noida and Noida and the shoot was completed in August 2021.

Soundtrack

The music was composed by Rochak Kohli, Jasleen Royal, JAM8, and Yug Bhusal. Lyrics were written by Siddharth–Garima, Bipin Das, Vayu, and Aditya Sharma.

Reception

Critical Response
Hiren Kotwani from The Times of India gave the film 2.5 stars out of 5 and summed up saying, "The first half seems to be taking the film’s title too seriously and is a little too ‘chilled out’ and meandering. It’s only at the interval point when more things happen, and the movie moves into higher gear. And the second half more than makes up for the ‘vellapanti’-filled first and also keeps you glued to the screen proceedings even though you half-anticipate them."

References

External links
 

2021 films
2021 comedy films
2020s Hindi-language films
Indian crime comedy films
Films scored by Rochak Kohli
Films scored by Sohail Sen
Films scored by Jasleen Royal
Films scored by JAM8
Hindi remakes of Telugu films
2020s crime comedy films